Cholistan Desert Jeep Rally (or simply "Cholistan Jeep Rally" or also known as "TDCP Cholistan Jeep Rally") is a rally raid type of off-road race, organised by the TDCP in Pakistan. The event is annually run in the Cholistan Desert venue. It was first introduced in 2005 by Tourism Development Corporation of Punjab (TDCP). The event is run by the Government of Punjab. The rally initiates near the Derawar Fort in Ahmadpur East Tehsil. Around 100 drivers and teams from all over Pakistan participate and almost 100,000 visitors witness it every year.

The word "Jeep" in the name of the rally has nothing to do with the car company "Jeep". This rally is not sponsored by or for exclusive use of Jeep vehicles. In Pakistan, the name/word Jeep has been used interchangeably for off-road vehicles or SUVs. It is not uncommon to hear phrases like "I have a Toyota Land Cruiser jeep", or "I drive a Nissan Patrol jeep".

The purpose to hold this event in the heart of Cholistan desert is to show outside world its history and rich culture and open this area as a winter tourist destination. It is anticipated that event will receive widespread projection in print and electronic media.

In 2023, the rally is set to happen between 6 and 12 February 2023. This year more than 100 drivers would be competing.

Cooperation 
The rally is held with cooperation of the following stake holders.

 Houbara Foundation International Pakistan
 Pakistan Army
 Punjab Rangers
 Toyota Indus Motor
 Cholistan Development Authority
 Punjab Wildlife Department
 Bahawalpur 4 wheel club (Host Club)
 Motor Sports Club Pakistan
 Toyota Highway Motors
 Bahawalpur 4x4 Club
 Punjab Motor Racing Club
 District Govt. Bahawalpur
 Bahawalpur Police
 District Govt. Bahawalnagar
 Bahawalnagar Police
 Print and Electronic media
 Auto Racing Club Pakistan
 Lahore 4 Wheel Drive Club

Winners

References

External links 
 Cholistan Desert Jeep Rally's official website

Rally competitions in Pakistan
Culture of Punjab, Pakistan
Rally raid races
Cholistan Desert
Tourism in Bahawalpur